John McEnroe was the defending champion and successfully defended his title, by defeating Ivan Lendl 6–4, 6–2 in the final.

In the semifinal match, Lendl defeated Jimmy Connors with a score of 6–0, 6–0, marking the third time ever (and the first time in the men's circuit) that a former World No.1 receives a double bagel in official matches.

Seeds
Some seeds received a bye into the second round.

Draw

Finals

Top half

Section 1

Section 2

Bottom half

Section 3

Section 4

References

External links
 Official results archive (ATP)
 Official results archive (ITF)

Singles